Caloptilia falconipennella is a moth of the family Gracillariidae. It is known from all of Europe, except the Balkan Peninsula.

The forewings are dark reddish-fuscous irrorated with whitish ; margins and fold dotted with black and an indistinct whitish triangular costal
blotch before middle. Hindwings are dark grey.

Adults are on wing in September and overwinter, reappearing in the spring.

The larvae feed on alder (Alnus glutinosa). They mine the leaves of their host plant which consists of a small lower-surface blotch near the leaf margin. The mine is in fact a tentiform mine, but so little silk is produced that the blotch hardly contracts at all. The mine is preceded by a quite short corridor, that is overrun by the later blotch. Older larvae leave the mine and start feeding under a flap of the leaf margin that is folded down and attached to the blade underside with silk. Two or three such folds are made on the same or another leaf.

References

External links
 

falconipennella
Moths described in 1813
Moths of Europe
Taxa named by Jacob Hübner